Mario Donatone (9 June 1933 – 14 April 2020) was an Italian actor.

Filmography

Film

Bellissima (1951) (uncredited)
The Passionate Thief (1960)
One Step to Hell (Caccia ai violenti) (1968)
Kong Island (1968) as Forrester
Io non spezzo... rompo (1971) as Tony Cupiello
Boccaccio (1972)
Storia di fifa e di coltello - Er seguito d'er più (1972)
Storia de fratelli e de cortelli (1973)
Kid il monello del west (1973)
Madeleine, anatomia di un incubo (1974)
Prete, fai un miracolo (1975)
The Cop in Blue Jeans (1976) as Brigadiere all'ambasciata (uncredited)
The Con Artists (1976) as Guard in 2nd Prison (uncredited)
Crimebusters (1976) as Vieri Servant (uncredited)
Due sul pianerottolo (1976)
Hit Squad (1976) as Pasquale Icardi (uncredited)
Squadra antitruffa (1977) as Uomo truffato (uncredited)
Il figlio dello sceicco (1978) as Uomo in ufficio a Roma (uncredited)
The Gang That Sold America (1979) as Man at Gitto's Funeral
Assassinio sul Tevere (1979) as Sabatucci
I Don't Understand You Anymore (1980)
Delitto a Porta Romana (1980) as Tassinelli
I'm Getting a Yacht (1980)
Uno contro l'altro, praticamente amici (1981) as Capo operaio (uncredited)
La casa stregata (1982) as Portiere dell'albergo (uncredited)
My Darling, My Dearest (1982)
Delitto sull'autostrada (1982) as Sergio Taruscio (uncredited)
Count Tacchia (1982) as Er Ciriola
Hajji Washington (1983)
Sing Sing (1983)
Il diavolo e l'acquasanta (1983) as Commissario
Crime in Formula One (1984) as Gaetano Maresca
A tu per tu (1984)
Phenomena (1985)
I Am an ESP (1985)
La signora della notte (1986)
Il camorrista (1986) as Il pretore del 1° processo
La croce dalle 7 pietre (1987)
Thrilling Love (1989) as Tony Boitan
The Godfather Part III (1990) as Mosca
L'angelo con la pistola (1991) as Velasco
Copenhagen fox-trot (1993)
S.P.Q.R.: 2,000 and a Half Years Ago (1994) as Princeps Senatus
Oltre la quarta dimensione (1996)
Roseanna's Grave (1997) as Old Guard
The Scent of the Night (1998) as Cardinale
La vita, per un'altra volta (1999) as Toccarello
Picasso's Face (2000) as Sosia Picasso
Si fa presto a dire amore (2000) as Gonzalo
Chi nasce tondo... (2000)
Agosto (2009) as Mario
Annamaura (2012) as Co-protagonist (credit only)
Il ragioniere della mafia (2013) as Cardinale Ascienza
La terra e il vento (2013) as Nonno Mario
Il ragazzo della Giudecca (2016) as Vecchietto
John Wick: Chapter 2 (2017) as Cardinal
Italian Business (2017) as Vittorio
Incontriamoci (2017) as Don Massimo (final film role)

Television
Parole e sangue (1982) as Bregni
Piazza Navona (1988)
Un uomo di rispetto (1993, TV Movie)

References

1933 births
2020 deaths
20th-century Italian male actors
21st-century Italian male actors
People from Tripoli, Libya
Libyan people of Italian descent